District 7 is a district east of the old town in the Swiss city of Zürich.

The district comprises the quarters Fluntern, Hottingen, Hirslanden and Witikon. All entities were formerly municipalities of their own, but were incorporated into Zürich in 1893 (Witikon in 1934).

References

 
7